Russell Freeman (September 2, 1969 - November 25, 2021) is a former player in the National Football League. He played for the Denver Broncos and the Oakland Raiders. He played collegiately for the Georgia Tech football team.

Living people
1969 births
American football offensive guards
American football offensive tackles
Players of American football from Pennsylvania
Georgia Tech Yellow Jackets football players
Denver Broncos players
Oakland Raiders players
People from Homestead, Pennsylvania